Big Leaguer is a 1953 American sports drama film starring Edward G. Robinson and was the first film directed by Robert Aldrich.

Although this story is fiction, Robinson's character in it, Hans Lobert, was an actual baseball player who played for five Major League Baseball teams and managed the Philadelphia Phillies. Third-billed in the cast, Jeff Richards was a professional ballplayer before he became an actor, and Hall of Fame pitcher Carl Hubbell appears as himself.

"It was not a personal film of my status at the time," said Aldrich later. "I feel the film was good but not indicative of what I wanted to express in the motion picture medium."

Plot
John "Hans" Lobert runs a training camp in Florida for baseball's New York Giants. Every year, he evaluates the 18- to 22-year-old hopefuls to pick the best for a minor league contract. All have dreams and talent, but the elimination whittles them down to a lucky few who will get the $150-a-month contract.

Lobert's niece comes down from the home office in New York and finds herself attracted to one of the players, the tall, quiet Adam Polachuk, a Polish-American from Pittston, Pennsylvania. Polachuk, the best prospect at third base, is trying to earn a spot on the team without his father knowing about it. His father, who knows nothing about baseball, thinks Adam is attending school. His father finds out about Adam's attempt to make the Giants just before the best of the recruits square off against the Brooklyn Dodgers' rookie squad.

The elder Polachuk is persuaded by manager Lobert to let his son play in the game before taking him home. Polachuk is the star of the game for the Giants both offensively and defensively as the Giants rally to win the game.

Cast
 Edward G. Robinson as John B. 'Hans' Lobert
 Vera-Ellen as Christy
 Jeff Richards as Adam Polachuk
 Richard Jaeckel as Bobby Bronson
 William Campbell as Julie Davis
 Carl Hubbell as himself
 Paul Langton as Brian McLennan
 Lalo Rios as Chuy Aguilar
 Bill Crandall as Tippy Mitchell
 Frank Ferguson as Wally Mitchell
 John McKee as Dale Alexander
 Mario Siletti as Mr. Polachuk
 Al Campanis as himself
 Bob Trocolor as himself
 Tony Ravis as himself
 Robert Calwell as Pomfret
 Donald 'Chippie' Hastings as Little Joe Polachuk
 Bing Russell
 Harv Tomter as himself (uncredited)

Production
The film was one of a series of low budget films made at MGM. According to Robert Aldrich, Louis B. Mayer "had wanted to put the sons of the guys who helped him form Metro into production work; and they had this thing called the sons of the pioneers... Three or four guys whose fathers had been helpful in first forming Metro."

Mayer left MGM in 1951 but Dore Schary kept alive the idea, in part because of the success of a low budget unit at MGM which he ran in the early 1940s. In January 1952 he announced the formation of a new production unit under the supervision of Charles Schnee. It included several sons of executives who had helped establish MGM, Matthew Raft (son of Harry Rapf), Arthur Loew (son of Marcus Loew), and Sidney Franklin Jnr (son of Sidney Franklin). Other producers were Hayes Goetz, Henry Berman (brother of Pandro S. Berman), and Sol Fielding. The idea was to make ten to fifteen films a year.

Big Leaguer was based on an original story by John McNulty, who sold it to producer Matthew Rapf at MGM.

Herbert Butler wrote a script and in November 1952 MGM announced they would make the film under the Charles Schnee unit. Robinson signed later that month, the first film he had shot at MGM since Our Vines Have Tender Grapes. Filming would not begin until March 1953 to take advantage of spring training.

Robert Aldrich had worked at Enterprise Studios as an assistant director and met Herbert Baker on So This is New York. Baker recommended Aldrich as director because he had worked in television and "knew athletes". "They were looking for 'bright young guys' who'd been on the firing line for a while, someone they thought they could give an opportunity to and who knew what he was doing because they didn't", said Aldrich. Aldrich was signed to direct in January, 1953.

Jeff Richards, who was cast a baseball player, had been a baseball player in real life.

Spring training filming took place at Melbourne, Florida with the real-life New York Giants. The film was shot in Cape Canaveral in 17 days "out of nowhere" said Aldrich.

Aldrich remembered star Edward G. Robinson as "a marvellous actor and a brilliant man but he was not physically co ordinated. He would walk to first base and trip over the home plate."

Reception
Aldrich said "The world wasn't waiting for that picture. It was a picture about the New York Giants and Metro had the foresight to open it in Brooklyn, so you can't have expected it to do very well. Nothing much came out of it." A Los Angeles Times reviewer called it a "cheery little opus" and praised Vera-Ellen's performance, saying she "surprises pleasantly with her straight acting effort."

According to MGM records the film earned $467,000 in the US and Canada and $92,000 elsewhere, resulting in a loss of $163,000.

References

External links
 
 

1953 films
1950s sports drama films
American baseball films
American black-and-white films
American sports drama films
1950s English-language films
Films directed by Robert Aldrich
Films set in Florida
Metro-Goldwyn-Mayer films
New York Giants (NL)
1953 directorial debut films
1953 drama films
1950s American films